Kantrum is a type of folk music played by the Khmer in Isan, Thailand, living near the border with Cambodia.  It is a fast, traditional dance music.  In its purest form, cho-kantrum, singers, percussion and fiddles dominate the sound.  A more modern form using electric instrumentation arose in the mid-1980s.

Language
Kantrum is interesting from a linguistic perspective.  As the Khmer native to Thailand are bilingual, kantrum songs can be sung in Thai (Isan dialect), Northern Khmer or a combination of the two. In the case of the later, it is most common that a complete verse will be sung in Thai followed by a reciprocating verse in Khmer. However, code switching between the two languages within the same verse also occurs, lending to a wide variety of possibilities for rhyming and tonal euphony.

Performers
In the late-1980s, Darkie became the genre's biggest star, crossing into mainstream markets in the later 1990s. Another artist known for Kantrum is Chalermpol Malakham although he is also a popular performer of Luk Thung and Morlam.

See also
Chrieng Brunh
Luk Thung
Morlam
Music of Thailand
Music of Cambodia
Khmer Surin

Cambodian music
Isan culture
Thai styles of music